Nichols Arboretum (123 acres, 49.7 hectares), locally known as the Arb, is an arboretum operated by the Matthaei Botanical Gardens and Nichols Arboretum (MBGNA) at the University of Michigan. Located on the eastern edge of its Central Campus at 1610 Washington Heights in Ann Arbor, Michigan, the Arboretum is a mosaic of University and City properties operated as one unit. The arboretum is open daily from sunrise to sunset with no charge for admission. The Huron River separates a northern section of the arboretum's floodplain woods; the railroad marks the northern border.

The arboretum was designed in 1906 by O. C. Simonds, and he used the steep glacial topography to include areas both for collections and natural areas. Many of the older plantings date from the 1920s and 1930s. It is particularly known for its W.E. Upjohn Peony Garden, Heathdale Collection (species primarily from Appalachia), the Centennial Shrub Collection and the Dow Prairie. The University of Michigan conducts controlled burns of the prairie each year in an attempt to maintain native species and habitat.

Students flock to the Arb for a variety of outdoor activities beyond assigned studies, such as jogging, picnicking, and sun-bathing.  Maps are posted, which include the length and type of trail (gravel, stairs, etc.). The Arb is a common spot for Ann Arbor's students to gather. During winter, students have been known to go sledding in the Arb using cafeteria trays from university dining halls. In recent summers, the Arb has been the site of Shakespeare in the Arb, dramatic performances of Shakespearean plays.

Mission 
Matthaei Botanical Gardens and Nichols Arboretum shared their new strategic plan on September 1, 2022. This plan included a new Mission Statement:

Matthaei Botanical Gardens and Nichols Arboretum is a transformative force for social and ecological resilience through the waters and lands we steward. We turn this commitment into action by:

-Positioning humans as active participants within the natural world and compelling the university community and our publics to negotiate the full complexity that entails

-Advancing partnerships, programs, user experience, and all that we steward to catalyze equity and justice in a radically changing world

-Emerging as University of Michigan’s premier partner for research, teaching, and public impact in sustainability, climate-forward practices, and biocultural diversity

-Promoting healthier communities, cultures, and ecosystems through active care and cultivation of the gardens, fields, natural habitats, and dynamic systems that sustain our world

Gallery

General collection 

Cedars of Lebanon (Cedrus libani) - four specimens, planted 1946, at the extreme edge of their cold hardiness range.
Chinese Fringetree (Chionanthus retusus) - believed the oldest specimen of the species in the state.
Ginkgo (Ginkgo biloba) - the oldest trees were planted before 1920.
Conifers - planted primarily in the 1910s to 1930s. Many species of pine (Pinus), spruce (Picea) and fir (Abies), including ponderosa pine (Pinus ponderosa), lodgepole pine (Pinus rigida), Engelman spruce (Picea engelmannii), and Nordman fir (Abies nordmannii).
Cupressaceae - four genera planted from the 1920s-1950s: junipers (Juniperus), arborvitae (Thuja and Platycladus) and false cypresses (Chamaecyparis).
Hackberries (Cannabaceae) - several species of hackberries (Celtis spp.)
Hawthorn - numerous hawthorn species, mostly from the 1920s are historically important and will be replaced.
Korean Quasibark Tree (Picrasma quassioides) - possibly the only specimens in Michigan, planted 1933.
Larches (Larix) - Japanese larches (Larix kaempferi) planted 1938, with a few European larches (Larix decidua) planted 1952.
Legume (Fabaceae) - Eastern redbud (Cercis canadensis), American yellowwoods (Cladrastis kentukea), honeylocust (Gleditsia triacanthos), Kentucky coffeetree (Gymnocladus dioicus), black locust (Robinia pseudoacacia), and Japanese pagoda tree (Sophora japonica).
Magnolias & Relatives - Fraser magnolias (Magnolia fraseri), umbrella magnolias (Magnolia tripetala), tuliptrees (Liriodendron tulipifera).
Maples, Horse Chestnuts and Buckeyes - planted 1920s and 1930s. Species include Trefoil Maple (Acer cissifolium), Sycamore Maple (Acer pseudoplatanus) and Japanese Maple (Acer palmatum), as well as the genus Aesculus including Horsechestnuts and Buckeyes.
Oaks - native oaks including red (Quercus rubra), white (Quercus alba), black (Quercus velutina), bur (Quercus macrocarpa), shingle (Quercus imbricaria), and swamp white (Quercus bicolor), as well as three Asian oaks representing sawtooth oak (Quercus acutissima) and oriental oak (Quercus variabilis).
Turkish Hazelnut (Corylus colurna) - is thriving in the Main Valley
Ulmaceae - American elms (Ulmus americana), European and Asian elms, Chinese elms (Ulmus parvifolia),  and Japanese zelkovas (Zelkova serrata).
White Pines (Pinus strobus) - about 150 eastern white pines were planted in 1952 and complement the much older stands throughout the Arb.

Other collections 
Centennial Shrub Collection - popular ornamental shrubs and small trees including crab apple trees, hawthorn trees, a lilac collection, and spiraea.
Dow Prairie and adjacent woods (36 acres, 14 hectares) - restored to pre-European settlement. Plants include Andropogon gerardi, Asclepias tuberosa, Carex bicknellii, Oligoneuron rigidum, Ratibida pinnata, Rudbeckia hirta, Schizachyrium scoparium, Silphium terebinthinaceum, Solidago speciosa, Sorghastrum nutans, Symphyotrichum laeve, Symphyotrichum oolentangiense, Vernonia missurica, and Veronicastrum virginicum.
Gateway Garden - an entry garden based on American meadows, with pools and a dry creek.
Heathdale - ericaceous and Appalachian Plants, including Catawba and Rosebay rhododendrons (Rhododendron catawbiense and R. maximum), azaleas (Rhododendron spp.), dog-hobble (Leucothoe fontanesiana), mountain laurel (Kalmia latifolia), as well as hemlock (Tsuga canadensis, T. caroliniana, and T. sieboldii), dogwoods (Cornus spp.), witch-hazel (Hamamelis virginiana), and sassafras (Sassafras albidum). Some date from plant collecting expeditions in the 1920s; others have been added in the past decade.
Rhododendrons - hybrid azaleas and rhododendrons hardy in Ann Arbor.
Oak Openings - a collection begun in 2001 and in its early stages. It will represent plants once common to oak openings (also called oak savannas) in the Ann Arbor area.
Peony Garden - 516 peony cultivars in 27 beds, with plantings dating from 1927. It is the largest public collection of historic (pre-1950) herbaceous peony cultivars in North America.

Natural areas 
Uplands - second and third-growth woodland, mostly oak-hickory forest. The oldest oaks range from 75 to 119 years old; the oldest hickories are 109–135 years old. This area includes red, black and white oaks (Quercus rubra, Quercus velutina, and Quercus alba); pignut hickory (Carya glabra); Bur oak (Quercus macrocarpa); white ash (Fraxinus americana); basswood (Tilia americana); shagbark hickory (Carya ovata); bitternut hickory (Carya cordiformis); and black walnut (Juglans nigra). Native understory species include ironwood (Ostrya virginiana), musclewood (Carpinus caroliniana), flowering dogwood (Cornus florida), witch-hazel (Hamamelis virginiana), alternate-leaf dogwood (Cornus alternifolia), maple-leaved viburnum (Viburnum acerifolium), and hazelnut (Corylus americana).
Wetlands - wet meadow and hardwood swamp species, including American elm (Ulmus americana), red ash (Fraxinus pennsylvanica), silver maple (Acer saccharinum), and black ash (Fraxinus nigra).

See also 
 Matthaei Botanical Gardens
 Horner-McLaughlin Woods
 List of botanical gardens in the United States

References

External links 
Matthaei Botanical Gardens & Nichols Arboretum
Shakespeare in the Arb

University of Michigan campus
Arboreta in Michigan
Botanical gardens in Michigan
Protected areas of Washtenaw County, Michigan
Huron River (Michigan)
Tourist attractions in Ann Arbor, Michigan
1907 establishments in Michigan